Reasin Beall (December 3, 1769February 20, 1843) was an American politician. He was an Ohio Congressman and a Militia General during the War of 1812.

Beall was born in 1769 in Frederick County in the Province of Maryland (in the portion of which would be later separated as Montgomery County in 1776), and his family moved to Washington County, Pennsylvania during his youth.

He married Rebecca Johnson ca. 1792. In about 1801, he and his family moved to Ohio, settling initially at Steubenville. He later moved from Jefferson County to New Lisbon, in Columbiana County, Ohio.

Military career
In 1790, Beall joined the military and participated in the Northwest Indian War in the Ohio Valley. He was on General Anthony Wayne's staff where he became acquainted with then Captain William Henry Harrison.

In Columbiana County, Ohio, he became a Colonel of the Militia.

During the War of 1812, he served as Brigadier General 2d Brigade Ohio Militia. He led several brigades from Eastern Ohio into the area of present Richland County, Ohio. He established one of his headquarters (Camp Christmas) at Wooster, Wayne County, Ohio.

Political career
Beall began his political career as Clerk of the Columbiana County Court.

After the War of 1812, he returned to New Lisbon and served in the Thirteenth United States Congress from April 20, 1813 to June 7, 1814, filling the vacancy of Rep. John S. Edwards, who had been elected but died before taking his seat.

Later years
The office of register of the Federal Land Office in Wooster became vacant in 1814, and Beall was appointed by the President and took up residence there. He held that position until resigning in 1824. He remained in Wooster until his death. He resigned from politics, with the exception of being named a Presidential elector in 1840. He was a Whig Presidential elector in 1840 for Harrison/Tyler.

Reasin Beall died age 73 in Wooster, Ohio.

Legacy
Beall's house still stands and is part of the College of Wooster, which once used it as a dormitory.

References

External links
General Reasin Beall homestead

1769 births
1843 deaths
College of Wooster
People from Lisbon, Ohio
People from Wooster, Ohio
1840 United States presidential electors
Ohio Whigs
19th-century American politicians
American militiamen in the War of 1812
American people of the Northwest Indian War
American militia generals
Democratic-Republican Party members of the United States House of Representatives from Ohio
People from Montgomery County, Maryland
People from Washington County, Pennsylvania
Military personnel from Pennsylvania